Insulin-like growth factor 2 mRNA-binding protein 1 is a protein that in humans is encoded by the IGF2BP1 gene.

This gene encodes a member of the IGF-II mRNA-binding protein (IMP) family. The protein encoded by this gene contains four K homology domains and two RNA recognition motifs. It functions by binding to the 5' UTR of the insulin-like growth factor 2 (IGF2) mRNA and regulating IGF2 translation.

See also
 IGF2BP2
 IGF2BP3

References

Further reading